Dizzy and Strings (also released as Diz Big Band) is an album by trumpeter Dizzy Gillespie, released in 1955 by Norgran Records.

Track listing
All compositions by Dizzy Gillespie except as indicated
 "Roses of Picardy" (Frederick Weatherly, Haydn Wood) - 4:38
 "Silhouette" (Johnny Richards) - 3:56
 "Can You Recall?" (Richards) - 3:27
 "O Solow" (Richards) - 5:06
 "Cool Eyes" - 3:48
 "Confusion" (Buster Harding) - 4:42
 "Pile Driver" - 3:54
 "Hob Nail Special" - 2:52

Personnel
Dizzy Gillespie - trumpet, vocals
Tracks 1-4 (with orchestra)
John Barrows, Jim Buffington, Jim Chambers, Fred Klein - French horn
George Berg, Jack Greenberg, Tom Parshley - woodwinds
Danny Bank - baritone saxophone
Wynton Kelly - piano
Percy Heath - bass
Jimmy Crawford - drums
Unidentified string section
Johnny Richards - arranger, conductor

Tracks 5-8 (with big band)
Jimmy Nottingham, Ernie Royal, Quincy Jones - trumpet
J. J. Johnson, George Matthews, Leon Comegys - trombone
George Dorsey, Hilton Jefferson - alto saxophone
Hank Mobley, Lucky Thompson - tenor saxophone
Danny Bank - baritone saxophone
Wade Legge - piano
Lou Hackney - bass
Charlie Persip - drums
Buster Harding - arranger

References 

Dizzy Gillespie albums
1954 albums
Norgran Records albums
Albums produced by Norman Granz
Albums with cover art by David Stone Martin